Baba Meydan-e Olya (also Romanized as Bābā Meydān-e ‘Olyā; also known as Bābā Meydān, Bābā Meydān-e Bālā, Bāmairūn, Bā Meydān, and Bāmeyrūn) is a village in Rostam-e Yek Rural District, in the Central District of Rostam County, Fars Province, Iran. At the 2006 census, its population was 614, in 121 families.

References 

Populated places in Rostam County